War depictions in film and television include documentaries, TV mini-series, and drama serials depicting aspects of historical wars, the films included here are films setv in the early modern history from the fall of the Byzantine Empire in 1453 until about the Age of Revolution in late 18th century.

Sengoku Period (1467–1573) 

 Sword for Hire (1952)
 The Seven Samurai (1954)
 Throne of Blood (1957)
 The Hidden Fortress (1958)
 The River Fuefuki (1960)
 Brave Records of the Sanada Clan (1963)
 Sengoku Yaro (1963)
 Samurai Spy (1965)
 Kagemusha (The Shadow Warrior) (1980)
 Shōgun (1980)
 Ran (1985)
 Rikyu (1989)
 Heaven and Earth (1990)
 Owls' Castle (1999)
 Samurai Commando: Mission 1549(2005)
 The Floating Castle(2012)
 Ask This of Rikyu(2013)
 The Seven Samurai (2014)
 Kagemusha Tokugawa Ieyasu (2014)
 Sanada Ten Braves (2016)
 Nobunaga Concerto (2016)
 Sekigahara (2017)
 Honnōji Hotel (2017)
 Touken Ranbu (2019)

Italian Wars (1494–1559) 

 The Sack of Rome (1920)
 Condottieri (1937)
 Ettore Fieramosca (1938)
 The Violent Patriot (1956)
 Flesh and Blood (1985)
 The Profession of Arms (2001)
 Ignacio de Loyola (2016)

Battle of Mactan (1521) 
 Lapu Lapu (1955)
 Lapu Lapu (2002)
 Boundless (2022)

Jiajing wokou raids (1540-1567) 
 God of War (2017)

French Wars of Religion (1562–1598) 
 La Reine Margot (1954)
 La Reine Margot (Queen Margot) (1994)
 Henri 4 (2010)
 La princesse de Montpensier (2010)

Philippine Revolts Against Spain (1567–1872) 
 Dagohoy (1953)
 Diego Silang (1951)
 Gabriela Silang (1971)

Eighty Years' War (1568–1648) 
 La Kermesse Héroique (1935)
 De vliegende Hollander (1995)
 Alatriste (2006)
 Kenau (2014)

Ottoman wars in Europe (1573-1813 )

Croatian–Slovene Peasant Revolt (1573) 
 Anno Domini 1573 (1975)

Long Turkish War (1593–1606) 
 Michael the Brave (1970)

Polish-Ottoman War (1620–1699) 
 Colonel Wolodyjowski (1969)
 September Eleven 1683 (2012)

First Serbian Uprising (1804–1813) 
 Život i dela besmrtnog vožda Karađorđa (1911)
 Pesma sa Kumbare (1955)
 Roj (1966)
 Vuk Karadžić (1987) (TV series)
 Bitka na Čegru (2006)

Anglo-Spanish War 
 Fire Over England (1937)
 The Sea Hawk (1940)
 The Fighting Prince of Donegal (1966)
 Elizabeth: The Golden Age (2007)

Japanese invasions of Korea (1592–98) 
 Immortal Admiral Yi Sun-sin (2004)
 Blades of Blood (2010)
 The Admiral: Roaring Currents (2014)
 The Jingbirok: A Memoir of Imjin War (2015)
 Warriors of the Dawn (2017)
 Hansan: Rising Dragon (2022)

Polish–Muscovite War (1605–1618) 
 Minin and Pozharsky (1939)
 Boris Godunov (1954)
 Boris Godunov (1986)
 Boris Godunov (1989)
 1612 (2007)

Anglo-Powhatan Wars (1609–1646) 
 The New World (2005)

Thirty Years' War (1618–1648)
 Alatriste (2006), depiction of the Battle of Rocroi
 The Last Valley (1970)
 May the Lord Be with Us (2018)

Qing conquest of the Ming (1618–1683) 

 Sword Stained with Royal Blood (1981)
 Sword Stained with Royal Blood (1993)
 The Sino-Dutch War 1661 (2000)
 The Showdown (2011)
 War of the Arrows (2011)
 Fall of Ming (2013)
 Brotherhood of Blades (2014)
 Brotherhood of Blades 2 (2016)
 The Fortress (2017)

American Indian Wars (1622–1924) 

 Custer's Last Stand (1936)
 North West Mounted Police (1940)
 They Died with Their Boots On (1941), depiction of the Battle of Little Big Horn
 Fort Apache (1948)
 She Wore a Yellow Ribbon (1949)
 Rio Grande (1950)
 Broken Arrow (1950)
 Only the Valiant (1951)
 The Battle at Apache Pass (1952)
 Brave Warrior (1952), fictionalised Battle of Tippecanoe
 Arrowhead (1953)
 Seminole (1953), Rock Hudson stars as an American officer who must battle his former friend, the Seminole war chief, Osceola, played by Anthony Quinn.
 7th Cavalry (1953)
 The Battle of Rogue River (1954)
 Apache (1954)
 The Indian Fighter (1955)
 Davy Crockett, King of the Wild Frontier (1955), Creek War
 The Last Frontier (1955)
 A Distant Trumpet (1964)
 Cheyenne Autumn (1964)
 Major Dundee (1965)
 The Glory Guys (1965)
 The Sons of Great Bear (1966)
 Chingachgook, die große Schlange (1967)
 Custer of the West (1967)
 Little Big Man (1970), depiction of the Battle of Little Big Horn
 A Man Called Horse (1970)
 Soldier Blue (1970)
 Ulzana's Raid (1972)
 One Little Indian (1973)
 The Return of a Man Called Horse (1976)
 The Court-Martial of George Armstrong Custer (1977) (TV)
 Triumphs of a Man Called Horse (1983)
 Dances with Wolves (1990)
 Son of the Morning Star (1991), depiction of the Battle of Little Big Horn (TV)
 The Last of His Tribe (1992)
 Geronimo: An American Legend (1993)
 The Broken Chain (1993)
 Crazy Horse (1996) (TV)
 Stolen Women: Captured Hearts (1997)
 Buffalo Soldiers (1997), (TV)
 The Miracle Men (2002), (TV)
 Spirit: Stallion of the Cimarron (2002)
 Hidalgo (2004), the early part of the film depicts the 1890 Battle of/Massacre at Wounded Knee
 Bury My Heart at Wounded Knee (2007), Battle of the Little Bighorn, and the Wounded Knee Massacre

English Civil War (1642–1651) 

 The Royal Oak (1923)
 The Fighting Blade (1923)
 The Vicar of Bray (1937)
 The Exile (1947)
 Forever Amber (1947)
 The Moonraker (1958)
 The Crimson Blade (1963)
 Witchfinder General (1968)
 Cromwell (1970), depictions of the Battles of Edgehill and Naseby
 Winstanley (1975)
 To Kill a King (2003)
 Cromwell in Ireland (2008)
 The Devil's Whore (2008), numerous battles and skirmishes of the Civil War and the harrying of Ireland
 A Field in England (2013)

Ukraino-Russian Liberation War from Poland (1648–1654) 

 The Rebel Son (1938)
 Bogdan Khmelnitskiy (1941)
 Trista let tomu... (1956)
 Invasion 1700 (1962)
 Taras Bulba (1962)
 With Fire and Sword (1999)
 Bohdan-Zinovii Hmelnytskyi (2007)
 Taras Bulba (2009)

Polish Commonwealth Wars (1648–1672) 
 Ogniem i Mieczem (With Fire and Sword) (1999) civil war – Cossacks revolt 1648–1651
 Potop (The Deluge) (1974) Second Northern War 1655–1660
 Pan Wolodyjowski (Colonel Wolodyjowski) (1969) 1660–1672 – skirmishes with Tartars and the beginning of Turkish – Polish Commonwealth war 1672–1676

Anglo-Dutch War (1652-1674) 
 Michiel de Ruyter (film)  (2015) Dutch admiral Michiel de Ruyter

War of Louis XIV（1660–1715）

 The Golden Hawk (1952)
 La prise de pouvoir par Louis XIV (1966)
 Louis, the Child King (1993)
 Revenge of the Musketeers (1994)
 Marquise (1997)
 Vatel (2000)
 La Femme Musketeer (2004)
 The Death of Louis XIV (2016)

Scanian War (1675–1679) 
 Snapphanar (2006)

Jacobite risings (1688–1746) 

 Kidnapped (1917)
 Bonnie Prince Charlie (1923)
 Kidnapped (1935)
 Kidnapped (1938)
 Kidnapped (1948)
 Bonnie Prince Charlie (1948)
 The Master of Ballantrae (1953)
 Kidnapped (1960)
 Culloden (1964)
 Kidnapped (1971)
 The Master of Ballantrae (1984)
 Kidnapped (1986)
 Chasing the Deer (1994)
 Kidnapped (1995)

Great Northern War (1700–1721) 
 Karl XII (1925)
 Pyotr perviy (Petr the First) (1937–1938) (Петр первый in Russia)
 Kalabaliken i Bender (1983)
 Sluga Gosudarev (The Sovereign's Servant) (2007) (Слуга государев in Russia)

Rákóczi's War of Independence (1703–1711) 

 Rákóczi nótája  (1943) Hungarian film
 Rákóczi hadnagya  (1954) Hungarian film
 Kard és kocka (1959) Hungarian film
 A Tenkes kapitánya (1963) Hungarian TV-Series
 Csínom Palkó (1973) Hungarian film
 A menekülő herceg  (1973) Hungarian TV-Movie
 Rákóczi fogságai  (2006) Hungarian TV-Movie

Hungary during Absolutism of the Habsburgs (1711–1848) 

 Kísértet Lublón (1976) Hungarian film
 Vivát, Benyovszky! (1975) Hungarian TV series
 Die unfreiwilligen Reisen des Moritz August Benjowski (1975) German-Italian TV series
 A császár parancsára (1957) Hungarian film
 Szegény gazdagok (1959) Hungarian film
 A járvány (1975) Hungarian film

War of the Austrian Succession (1740–1748) 
 Fanfan la Tulipe (2003)

Guaraní War (1754–1756) 
 The Mission (1986)

French and Indian War (1754–1763) 

 The Deerslayer and Chingachgook (1920) German silent film
 The Last of the Mohicans (1920) American film
 The Last of the Mohicans (1920) German film
 Leatherstocking (1924) American silent serial
 The Last of the Mohicans (1936)
 Northwest Passage (1940)
 Unconquered (1947)
 The Iroquois Trail (1950)
 Fort Ti (1953)
 The Last of the Mohicans (1992), depiction of the Battle of Fort William Henry
 Battle of the Brave (Nouvelle-France) (2004)
 The War that Made America (2006) PBS documentary

Seven Years' War (1756–1763) 

 Fanfan la Tulipe (1925) French film
 Das Flötenkonzert von Sans-souci (1930)
 Clive of India (1935)
 Fanfan la Tulipe (1952)
 Barry Lyndon (1975)
 Fanfan la Tulipe (2003)

Pugachev's Rebellion (1773–1775) 
 Salavat Yulayev (1940)
 The Captain's Daughter (1947)

See also 
List of war films and TV specials

References